Fótbóltsfelagið Giza, commonly known as FF Giza, was a Faroese football club from Tórshavn.

History
The club was founded in 2008 by some friends, who played for another club called NÍF (Nólsoyar Ítróttarfelag, founded in 1968) at the time.

Along with dreams of building a new superpower in Faroese football, these young men wanted a place to call home.

The club has initially played its home matches in Argir before moving to Tórshavn.

Its first official season was in 2009. In 2011, FF Giza won the 3. deild title, the first trophy in the club's history, and was promoted to 2. deild.

However, before the start of the 2012 season, the club merged with FC Hoyvík to create Giza Hoyvík.

Stadium
FF Giza played its home matches at Gundadalur's lower field (Niðari vøllur) in Tórshavn, with the capacity of 1,000.

Previously, the club played its home matches at Inni í Vika in Argir.

Honours
3. deild
Winners (1): 2011

Football clubs in the Faroe Islands
Association football clubs established in 1968
1968 establishments in the Faroe Islands
Defunct football clubs in the Faroe Islands